The Bark River is a tributary of the Rock River, about  long, in southeastern Wisconsin in the United States.  Via the Rock River, it is part of the watershed of the Mississippi River.  According to the Geographic Names Information System, it has also been known historically as the "Peelbark River". The Bark River rises in southern Washington County at Bark Lake In Richfield, WI and flows generally southwestwardly through Waukesha and Jefferson counties, past the communities of Hartland, Delafield, Summit Dousman and Rome, and through several small lakes.  It joins the Rock River in Jefferson County just east of Fort Atkinson. In Jefferson County the Bark River collects the Scuppernong River.

See also
List of Wisconsin rivers

References

Columbia Gazetteer of North America entry
DeLorme (1992).  Wisconsin Atlas & Gazetteer.  Freeport, Maine: DeLorme.  .

Rivers of Wisconsin
Rivers of Jefferson County, Wisconsin
Rivers of Washington County, Wisconsin
Rivers of Waukesha County, Wisconsin